(Z)-γ-bisabolene synthase (EC 4.2.3.40) is an enzyme with systematic name (2E,6E)-farnesyl-diphosphate diphosphate-lyase ((Z)-γ-bisabolene-forming). This enzyme catalyses the following chemical reaction

 (2E,6E)-farnesyl-diphosphate diphosphate  (Z)-γ-bisabolene + diphosphate

This enzyme is expressed in the root, hydathodes and stigma of the plant Arabidopsis thaliana.

References

External links 
 

EC 4.2.3